The 2014 Masters Grand Slam of Curling was held from October 28 to November 2 at the Selkirk Recreational Complex in Selkirk, Manitoba. It was the first men's Grand Slam event of the season and the second women's Grand Slam event of the season.

In the women's final, Valerie Sweeting of Edmonton won her first Grand Slam title with a 5–4 victory over Olympic silver medallists Margaretha Sigfridsson of Sweden. In the men's final, Brad Gushue of St. John's won his first Grand Slam title with an 8–6 victory over Mike McEwen of Winnipeg.

Men

Teams
The teams are listed as follows:

Round-robin standings
Final round-robin standings

Round-robin results
The draw is listed as follows:

Draw 1
Tuesday, October 28, 7:00 pm

Draw 3
Wednesday, October 29, 12:30 pm

Draw 4
Wednesday, October 29, 4:30 pm

Draw 5
Wednesday, October 29, 7:30 pm

Draw 7
Thursday, October 30, 12:30 pm

Draw 8
Thursday, October 30, 4:00 pm

Draw 9
Thursday, October 30, 7:30 pm

Draw 10
Friday, October 31, 9:00 am

Draw 11
Friday, October 31, 12:30 pm

Draw 12
Friday, October 31, 4:00 pm

Draw 13
Friday, October 31, 7:30 pm

Tiebreakers

Round 1
Saturday, November 1, 8:30 am

Round 2
Saturday, November 1, 12:30 pm

Saturday, November 1, 8:30 am

Playoffs

Quarterfinals
Saturday, November 1, 3:30 pm

Semifinals
Saturday, November 1, 9:00 pm

Final
Sunday, November 2, 2:00 pm

Women

Teams
The teams are listed as follows:

Round-robin standings
Final round-robin standings

Round-robin results
The draw is listed as follows:

Draw 1
Tuesday, October 28, 7:00 pm

Draw 2
Wednesday, October 29, 9:00 am

Draw 3
Wednesday, October 29, 12:30 pm

Draw 4
Wednesday, October 29, 4:30 pm

Draw 5
Wednesday, October 29, 7:30 pm

Draw 6
Thursday, October 30, 9:00 am

Draw 8
Thursday, October 30, 4:00 pm

Draw 9
Thursday, October 30, 7:30 pm

Draw 10
Friday, October 31, 9:00 am

Draw 11
Friday, October 31, 12:30 pm

Draw 12
Friday, October 31, 4:00 pm

Draw 13
Friday, October 31, 7:30 pm

Tiebreakers
Saturday, November 1, 8:30 am

Playoffs

Quarterfinals
Saturday, November 1, 12:00 pm

Semifinals
Saturday, November 1, 9:00 pm

Final
Sunday, November 2, 11:00 am

References

External links

Masters Grand Slam of Curling
Masters Grand Slam of Curling
Masters Grand Slam of Curling
Masters Grand Slam of Curling
Sport in Selkirk, Manitoba
Curling in Manitoba
Masters (curling)